Survival! is a collection of science fiction stories by American writer Gordon R. Dickson.  It was first published by Baen Books in 1984.  Most of the stories originally appeared in the magazines Astounding, Fantasy and Science Fiction, If, Imagination, Fantastic, Infinity Science Fiction, Future and Venture

Contents

 Preface, by Sandra Miesel
 "The Question"
 "Our First Death"
 "No Shield from the Dead"
 "The Underground"
 "After the Funeral"
 "The General and the Axe"
 "Button, Button"
 "Rescue"
 "Friend for Life"
 "Carry Me Home"
 "Jean Duprès"
 "Breakthrough Gang"

References

1984 short story collections
Short story collections by Gordon R. Dickson